In geometry, the Reeve tetrahedra are a family of polyhedra in three-dimensional space with vertices at , ,  and  where  is a positive integer. They are named after John Reeve, who in 1957 used them to show that higher-dimensional generalizations of Pick's theorem do not exist.

Counterexample to generalizations of Pick's theorem
All vertices of a Reeve tetrahedron are lattice points (points whose coordinates are all integers). No other lattice points lie on the surface or in the interior of the tetrahedron. In 1957 Reeve used this tetrahedron to show that there exist tetrahedra with four lattice points as vertices, and containing no other lattice points, but with arbitrarily large volume.

In two dimensions, the area of every polyhedron with lattice vertices is determined as a formula of the number of lattice points at its vertices, on its boundary, and in its interior, according to Pick's theorem. The Reeve tetrahedra imply that there can be no corresponding formula for the volume in three or more dimensions.

Despite this negative result, it is possible (as Reeve showed) to devise a more complicated formula for lattice polyhedron volume that combines the number of lattice points in the polyhedron, the number of points of a finer lattice in the polyhedron, and the Euler characteristic of the polyhedron.

Ehrhart polynomial
The Ehrhart polynomial of any lattice polyhedron counts the number of lattice points that it contains when scaled up by an integer factor.
The Ehrhart polynomial of
the Reeve tetrahedron  of height  is

This example shows that Ehrhart polynomials can sometimes have negative coefficients.

References 

Digital geometry
Lattice points